The 2003 MAC men's basketball tournament, a part of the 2002–03 NCAA Division I men's basketball season, took place from March 10–15 at Gund Arena in Cleveland.  Its winner received the Mid-American Conference's automatic bid to the 2003 NCAA tournament. It was a single-elimination tournament with four rounds and the three highest seeds received byes in the first round. All MAC teams were invited to participate. Central Michigan, the MAC regular season winner, received the number one seed in the tournament. Central Michigan defeated Kent State in the final. In the NCAA tournament they defeated Creighton in the first round before losing to Duke.

Tournament

Seeds 
 Central Michigan
 Kent State
 Miami
 Northern Illinois
 Western Michigan
 Akron
 Marshall
 Ball State
 Bowling Green
 Eastern Michigan
 Ohio
 Toledo
 Buffalo

Bracket 

* – Denotes overtime period

References 

Basketball in Cleveland
Tournament
Mid-American Conference men's basketball tournament
MAC men's basketball tournament
MAC men's basketball tournament